This is a list of football stadiums in England, ranked in descending order of capacity. There is an extremely large number of football stadiums and pitches in England, and a definitive list of stadia would be impossible to produce. This list therefore includes:

 The stadiums of all 116 clubs in the top five tiers of the English football league system as of the 2022-23 season (Premier League, EFL Championship, EFL League One, EFL League Two and National League).
 The stadiums of the 12 clubs in the top tier of women's football in England, the FA WSL, as of 2022-23.
 The stadiums of teams from England which play in national-level leagues of other football associations, as of the 2022-23 season (currently 1).
 All other football stadiums with a capacity of at least 5,000.

A person who has watched a match at the stadiums of all 92 Premier League and English Football League (EFL) clubs in England and Wales may apply to join The 92 Club.

Existing stadiums

Old stadiums

Following crowd troubles in the 1980s, and regulations imposed after the Taylor Report, several English league stadiums have been built or completely redeveloped in the last few years. Prior to 1988, however, the last newly built Football League ground in England was Roots Hall, Southend, which was opened in 1955.

Future stadiums
Stadiums which are currently in development include:

See also 
 Record home attendances of English football clubs
 List of Scottish football stadiums by capacity
 List of football stadiums in Wales by capacity
 List of association football stadiums by capacity
 List of European stadiums by capacity
 Development of stadiums in English football
 List of Premier League stadiums
 List of British stadiums by capacity
 List of English rugby union stadiums by capacity
 List of English rugby league stadiums by capacity
 List of association football stadiums by country

References